Silab, Silabs or Seylab or Seilab or Sailab may refer to:

 Seylab, East Azerbaijan
 Silab, Kohgiluyeh and Boyer-Ahmad
 Seylab, Kurdistan
 Silab, West Azerbaijan
 Silicon Labs, a fabless manufacturer of semiconductors